The discography of Clannad, an Irish musical group, consists of thirteen studio albums, four live albums, three soundtrack albums, seventeen compilation albums, thirty-one singles and a number of other appearances.

Clannad achieved a breakthrough in their career in 1983 with the song "Theme from Harry's Game", which peaked at number five in the United Kingdom and won an Ivor Novello award. Clannad won a BAFTA for their 1984 Legend, the soundtrack for the Robin of Sherwood series. In 1998, Clannad were awarded a Grammy award for their studio album Landmarks.

Albums

Studio albums

Live albums

Soundtrack albums

Compilation albums

Box sets

Video albums

EPs

Singles

Notes

References

External links
 Official Clannad website
 

Clannad
 
Discographies of Irish artists
Folk music discographies
Pop music group discographies